Spencer Pumpelly (born December 28, 1974) is an American professional racing driver who competes part-time in IMSA, driving the No. 44 Acura NSX GT3 for Magnus Racing with Archangel Motorsports. A veteran sports car racing driver, he has competed in IMSA and its predecessor series, the Rolex Sports Car Series and the American Le Mans Series since 1998 and 1999, respectively. He also has competed in the Continental Tire Sports Car Challenge and the ARCA Menards Series in the past.

Racing career

 
Pumpelly made his stock car racing debut when he competed in the ARCA Re/Max Series race at New Jersey Motorsports Park in 2009. Driving the No. 09 for TRG Motorsports using RAB Racing's owner points, he qualified fifth, and in the race, he led 7 laps, and finished third.

Pumpelly drove for Flying Lizard Motorsports and BGB Motorsports during the 2013 season.

Pumpelly competed in the American Le Mans Series and Rolex Sports Car Series before the two series merged to become the IMSA SportsCar Championship Series in 2014. 

On May 17, 2021, it was announced that Pumpelly would make his debut in the NASCAR Xfinity Series in the new race at Circuit of the Americas. He would drive the JD Motorsports No. 6 car, replacing its normal driver Ryan Vargas. Vargas had struggled during the season and with the race at COTA having qualifying and a smaller field of 36 cars (instead of the typical 40 in races without qualifying), the No. 6 car was in danger of failing to qualify due to being low in owner points.

In 2023, Pumpelly returned to SRO competition, joining Pedro Torres and ACI Motorsports in the GT World Challenge America.

Personal life
Pumpelly lives with his wife Lindsay, son Ryder that goes to Springdale Park 
, and daughter Parker in Atlanta. He has been a vegetarian since 2003 and a vegan since 2010. During a visit to the Farm Sanctuary in June 2011, Spencer was quoted, saying "I'm honored to support Farm Sanctuary and the people who are devoted to defending others."

Motorsports career results

24 Hours of Le Mans results

NASCAR
(key) (Bold – Pole position awarded by qualifying time. Italics – Pole position earned by points standings or practice time. * – Most laps led.)

Xfinity Series

 Season still in progress

ARCA Re/Max Series
(key) (Bold – Pole position awarded by qualifying time. Italics – Pole position earned by points standings or practice time. * – Most laps led.)

Complete WeatherTech SportsCar Championship results
(key) (Races in bold indicate pole position; results in italics indicate fastest lap)

References

External links
 
 

1974 births
Living people
24 Hours of Daytona drivers
24 Hours of Le Mans drivers
American Le Mans Series drivers
Rolex Sports Car Series drivers
NASCAR drivers
ARCA Menards Series drivers
Racing drivers from Atlanta
Sportspeople from Arlington County, Virginia
Racing drivers from Virginia
WeatherTech SportsCar Championship drivers
FIA Motorsport Games drivers
AF Corse drivers
Audi Sport drivers
W Racing Team drivers
Michelin Pilot Challenge drivers